Mandoto is a town, commune and district in Madagascar. It belongs to the  Vakinankaratra Region. The population of the district was estimated to be approximately 227,800 in 2018. It was formed by splitting up the district of Betafo.

Geography
This district is situated on the route nationale No.34 at 117 km West of Antsirabe and 129 km East of Miandrivazo. It is also crossed by the  RIP 143 Ankazomiriotra – Fidirana,  RIP 138 Ambatolahy – Betsohana and RIP 143bis Viliabe (Mandoto) – Vasiana.

Communes
The district is further divided into nine communes:

 Anjoma Ramartina
 Vinany
 Vasiana
 Ankazomiriotra
 Ananambao Ambary
 Besohana
 Fidirana
 Mandoto
 Maromandray

References and notes 

Districts of Vakinankaratra